WRUF (850 kHz) is an AM radio station that operates from the University of Florida's main campus in Gainesville, broadcasting at 850 kHz. WRUF is a sports station that covers University of Florida athletics. Unlike its public sister stations, WUFT TV and WUFT-FM, WRUF is a commercial station and, despite being state-run, is run no differently from privately owned commercial stations.

The station signed on in October 1928 and is the fifth-oldest station in the state.

WRUF featured a mixture of local and syndicated programs, including Jim Bohannon, Dr. Joy Browne, Larry King Live and Sporting News Radio, plus religious programming on Sunday mornings, including Bill Gaither, The Director of Programming is Rob Harder, Assistant Program Director/Brand Manager is Seth Harp and the Sports Director is Steve Russell.

WRUF's sports news departments, staffed almost entirely by School of Journalism students, are fairly large for a station of its size; by at least one account it has the largest local radio news department in Florida.

A WRUF microphone used by UF alumnus Red Barber during the 1930s is part of the National Baseball Hall of Fame and Museum's collection. It has been displayed in the museum's "Scribes and Mikemen" exhibit and from 2002 to 2006 it was a part of the "Baseball as America" traveling exhibition.

In 2010, WRUF changed their format from news and talk (previously in existence since 1993 and known as Newsradio AM 850 WRUF) to sports (Sportsradio 850) and on June 29, 2012, WRUF received the ESPN Radio affiliation.

The station is an affiliate of all three of the city of Tampa's major professional sports teams: the Tampa Bay Rays of Major League Baseball, the Tampa Bay Lightning of the National Hockey League, and since 2020, the Tampa Bay Buccaneers of the National Football League. It is the flagship station for the Florida Gators football, basketball, baseball, women's basketball, lacrosse, soccer and volleyball.

On August 19, 2015, WRUF began simulcasting on FM translator W237EJ 95.3 FM in Gainesville. It exists mainly to fill in the gaps because Tower #3 of their directional AM array failed in 2016, and the FCC granted permission to operate non-directionally after sunset at 25% of licensed power. Shortly afterward, the station changed its branding from "ESPN 850" to "ESPN 95.3," after the translator.

On December 1, 2016, WRUF switched its FM translator from W237EJ 95.3 FM Gainesville (now simulcasting WUFT-FMHD3 as CHR-formatted GHQ) to W251CG 98.1 FM Gainesville.

Previous logo
  (WRUF's logo under previous 95.3 FM translator)

References

External links
WRUF-AM website
Station History from Central Florida Radio
Baseball as America Traveling Exhibition

University of Florida
RUF
Radio stations established in 1928
1928 establishments in Florida